The SCR-694 was a portable two way radio set used by the U.S. military during World War II.

History
The SCR-694 replaced the SCR-284 and was later replaced by the AN/GRC-9. Designed to provide communication between moving or stationary vehicles or as a portable field radio set, the SCR-694 was originally intended for use by mountain troops and airborne forces but soon became the Army-wide standard at battalion level.

The SCR-694 saw use all over the army in many different theaters; notable instances include at regimental division headquarters during the Normandy invasion and the Cabanatuan prison raid as well as by scouts and reconnaissance units in the Pacific War.

Specifications
The SCR-694 "Radio set, Portable/Vehicular" consisted of the BC-1306 vacuum tube transmitter/receiver capable of AM and CW mode operation between 3.800 and 6.500 MHz.
Weight — 19.5 pounds.
Range — up to 15 miles on AM voice. Up to 30 miles reported on Morse code between moving vehicles
Transmitter — Crystal control, frequency doubler  
Power supply — 6, 12 or 24 Volts DC, PE-237 Vibrator Power Unit
Optional accessories — hand crank generator with seat, antenna system, spares tube kit, canvas bags, Jeep mounting plates. 
Manual — TM 11-230C

See also
 Signal Corps Radio
 SCR-300
 SCR-536

Notes

References
 TM 11-230 dated 15 Aug. 1944
 TM 11-227 Signal Communication Directory. dated 10 April 1944
 TM 11-487 Electrical Communication systems Equipment. dated 2 Oct. 1944

External links
 https://www.youtube.com/watch?v=LACLE6YTV28 training film
 http://www.olive-drab.com/od_electronics_angrc9.php
 https://web.archive.org/web/20090205020349/http://gordon.army.mil/OCOS/Museum/ScrComponents/scrPart1.asp SCR list

Amateur radio transmitters
Military radio systems of the United States
World War II American electronics
Military electronics of the United States